The Show Me Center is a multi-purpose arena, located on the campus of Southeast Missouri State University, in Cape Girardeau, Missouri.

Since its opening in 1987, this joint project between the City of Cape Girardeau and the university annually hosts approximately 250 meeting room and 160 arena events as an entertainment, meeting, and gathering center. It replaced Houck Field House as the primary home of Southeast Missouri State's athletics teams.

In 2015 the Show Me Center underwent a $5.62 million upgrade. The changes included: new scoreboards and shot clocks, a center-hung video display, new seating in the lower section, an improved audio system, and LED lighting above the court.

The arena is also the home of the NCAA Division I Southeast Missouri State University Redhawks basketball teams, and seats 7,373 for such events.

The Center hosted the 1991 NCAA Women's Division II Basketball Championship.

The arena has hosted several nationally televised professional wrestling events in its history, including the WWF in April 1988 and WCW in January 2000.

See also
 List of NCAA Division I basketball arenas

References

External links
Show Me Center Homepage

Sports venues in Missouri
Southeast Missouri State Redhawks basketball
College basketball venues in the United States
Indoor arenas in Missouri
Buildings and structures in Cape Girardeau, Missouri
1987 establishments in Missouri
Sports venues completed in 1987
Basketball venues in Missouri